Red State may refer to:
 Red state, a state in the United States with a tendency toward electing Republicans
 Red State (2006 film), a documentary film by Michael Shea
 Red State (2011 film), a film by Kevin Smith
 RedState, an American political weblog aimed at Republicans and American conservatives